Bruce Ellis (born 1960, nicknamed Brucee) is a computer scientist who worked at Bell Labs during the 1980s and 90s. He was educated at the University of Sydney, Australia, where he earned First Class Honours with the University Medal. He worked there on the Basser branch of UNIX/32V.

This work continued at Bell Labs where he was involved in the development of the later research versions of Unix, software for the Blit terminal, the Plan 9 from Bell Labs and Inferno operating systems, as well as ventures into network processing (the Froggie).

Recreationally he has also dabbled with computer go, computational linguistics, and with Rob Pike was responsible for the infamous Mark V Shaney in the early 1980s.

After leaving Bell Labs he has been consulting and lecturing around the world while working on the OzInferno operating system as a continuation of the work he had done on the research version of Inferno. He is currently living in Sydney.

Other works of his include the mash shell, 64 bit support for the Plan 9 cross compilers suite, Plan9 Emulation Environment (9ee) for disparate platforms, and various PostScript interpreters currently used by commercial printer manufacturers.

External links
Home page
Froggie
The 1984 Usenix Computer Go Tournament
IWP9 2006
Invited Talk
Using Inferno to Execute Java on Small Devices by Bruce Ellis et al.
9ee

Computer programmers
Unix people
Plan 9 people
Inferno (operating system) people
Scientists at Bell Labs
Living people
1960 births